André Marie Constant Duméril (1 January 1774 – 14 August 1860) was a French zoologist. He was professor of anatomy at the Muséum national d'histoire naturelle from 1801 to 1812, when he became professor of herpetology and ichthyology. His son Auguste Duméril was also a zoologist, and the author citation Duméril is used for both André and his son.

Life 
André Marie Constant Duméril was born on 1 January 1774 in Amiens and died on 14 August 1860 in Paris.

He became a doctor at a young age, obtaining, at 19 years,  the prévot of anatomy at the medical school of Rouen. In 1800, he left for Paris and collaborated in the drafting of the comparative anatomy lessons of Georges Cuvier.

He replaced Cuvier at the Central School of the Panthéon and had, as his colleague, Alexandre Brongniart. In 1801, he gave courses to the medical school of Paris. Under the Restauration, he was elected a member of the Académie des Sciences (French Academy of Sciences) and after 1803 succeeded Lacépède, who was occupied by his political offices, as professor of herpetology and ichthyology at the Muséum national d'histoire naturelle. Duméril only officially received this chair in 1825, after the death of Lacépède.

He published his Zoologie analytique in 1806. This covered the whole of the animal kingdom and shows the relations between genera as then distinguished, but not among species. He was elected a member of the American Philosophical Society in Philadelphia in 1813. In 1832, Gabriel Bibron (1806–1848), who became his assistant, was given the task of describing the species for an expanded version of Zoologie analytique, while Nicolaus Michael Oppel (1782–1820) assisted him with a revised higher-order systematics. After the death of Bibron, he was replaced by Auguste Duméril, André's son. However, Bibron's death delayed the publication of the new work for 10 years. In 1851, the two Dumérils, father and son, published the Catalogue méthodique de la collection des reptiles (although Auguste was apparently the true author) and in 1853, André Duméril alone published Prodrome de la classification des reptiles ophidiens. This last book proposes a classification of all the snakes in seven volumes.

Duméril, upon discovering a case of preserved fishes in the attic of the house of Georges-Louis Leclerc, Comte de Buffon, finally described the species that had been collected by Philibert Commerson nearly 70 years earlier.

He then  published a very important work, l’Erpétologie générale ou Histoire naturelle complète des reptiles (nine volumes, 1834–1854). In this, 1,393 species are described in detail and their anatomy, physiology, and bibliography are specified. However, Duméril maintained the amphibians among the reptiles in spite of the work of Alexandre Brongniart or Pierre André Latreille or the anatomical discoveries of Karl Ernst von Baer (1792–1876) and Johannes Peter Müller (1801–1858).

He was interested all his life in the insects and published several memoirs on entomology. His principal entomological work is Entomologie analytique (1860, two volumes). With his son Auguste, also a zoologist, he created the first vivarium for reptiles of the Jardin des Plantes. Duméril always considered observations on animal behaviour of taxonomic significance.

After 1853, he began to cede his position to his son and he retired completely in 1857. He was made a commander of the Legion of Honour two months before his death.

Species named after A.M.C. Duméril
The worm Platynereis dumerilii 
The Greater Amberjack fish Seriola dumerili  

The bryozoan, Callopora dumerilii  
The moth Luperina dumerilii 
The isopod Rocinela dumerilii 
The aquatic isopod crustacean Sphaeroma dumerilii 
The Filefish Cantherhines dumerilii
The Lizard Acanthodactylus dumerilii 
 The Boa Snake Acrantophis dumerili 
The wolf snake Lycodon dumerili 
The coral snake Micrurus dumerilii 
The Amazon River Turtle Peltocephalus dumerilianus 
The lizard Stenocercus dumerilii 
The Snake Urotheca dumerilii 
The Monitor Lizard Varanus dumerilii

See also 
Gabriel Bibron
Auguste Duméril

References

External links

Duméril's classification of the insects

1774 births
1860 deaths
Commandeurs of the Légion d'honneur
French entomologists
French ichthyologists
French herpetologists
Members of the French Academy of Sciences
People from Amiens
Burials at Père Lachaise Cemetery
National Museum of Natural History (France) people
19th-century French zoologists
Duméril (used also for his son)